Goniatitoidea, formerly Goniatitaceae in older publications, is a superfamily of late Paleozoic ammonoid cephalopods included in the Goniatitida. They are characterized by thinly discoidal to globular shells with variable umbilici and sculpture. The ventral lobe, located along the outer margin, is prominently bifurcated (two pronged); the lateral lobe undivided.

References
 Miller, Furnish, and Schindewolf 1957.  Paleozoic Ammonoidea; Treatise  on Invertebrate Paleontology, Part L Ammonoidea; Geologocial Society of America and Univ. of Kansas Press. 
GoniatitoideaPaleo db 9/07/2013
Goniatitoidea in GONIAT Taxonomy online 

 
Goniatitida superfamilies
Goniatitina